Cody Caves Provincial Park is a provincial park in British Columbia, Canada. It was formed in July 1966 to protect the Cody Caves and was the first subterranean park in British Columbia.  The park is 13 km by road, northwest from the hot springs community of Ainsworth Hot Springs on Kootenay Lake.

Notes

External links
 
BC Parks webpage

Provincial parks of British Columbia
Caves of British Columbia
West Kootenay
1966 establishments in British Columbia
Protected areas established in 1966